Sheldon Lake State Park and Environmental Learning Center is a 2,800-acre outdoor education and recreation facility in northeast Harris County managed by the Texas Parks and Wildlife Department. The site is located along Sheldon Lake reservoir. The federal government constructed the reservoir on Carpenter's Bayou in 1942 in order to support growing war-related industries along the Houston Ship Channel. The Texas Parks and Wildlife Department acquired the reservoir in 1952, opening it in 1955 as the Sheldon Wildlife Management Area. The site was designated a state park in 1984.

Features
The park features recreational opportunities including group camping, picnic areas, hiking trails, wildlife viewing, fishing, and an environmental learning center. Alternative energy technologies and green building techniques were used during construction of many of the parks structures, including the Pond Center, an open-entry pavilion the formerly housed the site's office, lab, and garage.

The John Jacob Observation Tower is an 82-foot wheelchair-accessible structure, allowing park visitors opportunities to view the surrounding wetlands and prairie, as well as the skyline of downtown Houston.

See also
List of Texas state parks
Sheldon Lake

References

External links
 Sheldon Lake State Park and Environmental Learning Center
 
 U.S. Geological Survey Map at the U.S. Geological Survey Map Website. Retrieved January 18, 2023.

State parks of Texas
Protected areas of Harris County, Texas
1955 establishments in Texas
Protected areas established in 1955